Sohan Potai (born 29 April 1958) is a member of the 14th Lok Sabha of India. He represents the Kanker constituency of Chhattisgarh and is a member of the Bharatiya Janata Party (BJP) political party.

External links
 Home Page on the Parliament of India's Website

1958 births
Living people
Bharatiya Janata Party politicians from Chhattisgarh
India MPs 2004–2009
India MPs 1998–1999
India MPs 1999–2004
India MPs 2009–2014
Lok Sabha members from Chhattisgarh
People from Kanker district